James William Somerville (born 22 June 1961) is a Scottish pop singer and songwriter. He sang in the 1980s with the pop groups Bronski Beat and The Communards, and has also had a solo career. He is known in particular for his powerful and soulful countertenor/falsetto singing voice. Many of his songs, such as "Smalltown Boy", contain political commentary on gay-related issues.

Early life
Born on 22 June, 1961, James William Somerville grew up in Ruchill, a neighbourhood of northern Glasgow. In 1980 he moved to London, where he lived in squats. He immersed himself in gay culture, and attended the London Gay Teenage Group.

Career

In 1983, Somerville co-founded the synthpop group Bronski Beat, which had several hits in the British charts. Their biggest hit was "Smalltown Boy", which reached No. 3 in the UK charts. In the music video Somerville plays the song's titular character, who leaves his hostile hometown for the friendlier city, reflecting Somerville's own experiences when he moved to London.

Somerville left Bronski Beat in 1985 and formed The Communards with classically-trained pianist Richard Coles, who became a Church of England vicar (retired, April 2022) and broadcaster. They had several hits, including a cover version of Harold Melvin & the Blue Notes' "Don't Leave Me This Way", which spent four weeks at No. 1 in the UK charts and became the biggest-selling single of 1986 in the UK. He also sang backing vocals on Fine Young Cannibals' version of "Suspicious Minds", which was a UK Top 10 hit.

The Communards split in 1988; Somerville began a solo career the following year. He released his debut solo album Read My Lips in November 1989, which contained three UK Top 30 hits, including a hit cover of Sylvester's disco classic "You Make Me Feel (Mighty Real)" and a cover of "Comment te dire adieu?", a duet with June Miles-Kingston, which reached number 14 in the UK Singles chart. He also sang on the second Band Aid project at the end of 1989.

In November 1990, Somerville's greatest-hits album The Singles Collection 1984/1990 (which featured his hits with Bronski Beat and The Communards in addition to his own material) was released; it reached number 4 on the UK Album Chart. It included a reggae cover of the Bee Gees' hit song "To Love Somebody", which also reached the UK Top 10. Also in 1990, Somerville contributed the song "From This Moment On" to the Cole Porter tribute album Red Hot + Blue produced by the Red Hot Organization, the proceeds from which benefited AIDS research.

In 1991, Somerville provided backing vocals to a track called "Why Aren't You in Love With Me?" from the album Ripe by Communards offshoot band Banderas. The Banderas duo, Caroline Buckley and Sally Herbert, had previously been part of Somerville's backing band. After this, he disappeared from the limelight for several years. He returned in 1995 with the album Dare to Love, which included "Heartbeat" (a UK Top 30 hit and a No. 1 hit on the US dance chart), "Hurt So Good" and "By Your Side", though commercial success was now beginning to elude him and his contract with London Records to which he had been signed for over a decade came to an end.

A new single, "Dark Sky", was released in 1997 and peaked at No. 66 in the UK. In the same year he provided vocals on "The Number One Song in Heaven" for the Sparks album Plagiarism with production by Tony Visconti. His third album, entitled Manage The Damage, was released in 1999 via Gut Records, but failed to chart. A companion remix album, Root Beer, came out in 2000. His dance-orientated fourth solo album, Home Again, was released in 2004, again not charting.

May 2009 saw the release of Somerville's Suddenly Last Summer album, which contained acoustic interpretations of other people's songs. The album was initially only available as a digital download but in May 2010 was made available in a limited edition (3,000 copies) CD/DVD in the UK. In late 2010, Somerville released a dance EP called Bright Thing.

2010's EP Bright Thing was the first of a series of three, with Somerville releasing Momentum in 2011 and Solent in 2012, with long-term collaborator John Winfield.

Somerville released a disco-inspired album called Homage in 2014. Singles were "Back to Me" followed by "Travesty". The emphasis in recording the album was on achieving the musical authenticity of original disco which Somerville grew up listening to. He stated: "I've finally made the disco album I always wanted to and never thought I could."

He has also had an acting career, appearing in Sally Potter's 1992 film of Virginia Woolf's Orlando, in Isaac Julien's 1989 Looking for Langston, and in an episode of the cult science fiction television series Lexx ("Girltown").

In February 2021, Somerville teamed up with producer Sally Herbert (formerly of 1990s duo Banderas and also part of The Communards' backing band) to record a cover of "Everything Must Change" by Benard Ighner as a charity record for End Youth Homelessness, a network of projects which includes Centrepoint in London and a number of other homeless charity organisations around the UK.

Discography

Solo albums
Read My Lips (1989)
Dare to Love (1995)
Manage the Damage (1999)
Home Again (2004)
Suddenly Last Summer (2009)
Homage (2015)

With Bronski Beat
The Age of Consent (1984)
Hundreds & Thousands (1986)

With The Communards
Communards (1986)
Red (1987)

Awards and nominations
{| class="wikitable plainrowheaders"
|+ List of awards and nominations for Jimmy Somerville
! Awards!! Year !! Work !! Category !! Result !! Ref. 
|-
! scope="row" rowspan=4|Brit Awards
| rowspan=2|1985
| Bronski Beat
| British Group
| 
|rowspan=2|
|-
| "Smalltown Boy"
| rowspan=2|British Single of the Year
| 
|-
| 1987
| "Don't Leave Me This Way"
| 
|
|-
| 1991
| Himself
| British Male Solo Artist
| 
|
|-
! scope="row"|British Film Institute
| 1984
| Framed Youth
| Grierson Award
| 
|
|-
!scope="row"|Queerty Awards
| 2014
| "Travesty"
| Earworn of the Year
| 
| 
|-
! scope="row"|RSH Gold Awards
| 1991
| Himself
| Power Groove of the Year
| 
|

See also

List of artists who reached number one on the US Dance chart
List of gay, lesbian or bisexual people
List of Glaswegians
List of performers on Top of the Pops
List of Scottish musicians
List of synthpop artists

References

External links

Jimmy Somerville's official website
Jimmy Somerville interview 
Jimmy Somerville at the British Film Institute

How '80s LGBTQ band Bronski Beat’s haunting ‘Smalltown Boy’ made a difference: ‘It was very bold'

1961 births
21st-century Scottish male singers
20th-century Scottish male singers
Scottish house musicians
Gay singers
Gay songwriters
Scottish LGBT singers
Scottish LGBT songwriters
Bronski Beat members
The Communards members
Living people
Musicians from Glasgow
Scottish new wave musicians
Scottish pop singers
Scottish singer-songwriters
British hi-NRG musicians
British synth-pop new wave musicians
Male new wave singers
Scottish tenors
Countertenors
Gut Records artists
20th-century Scottish LGBT people
21st-century Scottish LGBT people
Scottish gay musicians